John William Ransom Taylor, OBE Hon DEng FRAeS FRHistS AFIAA, (8 June 1922 – 12 December 1999) was a British aviation expert and editor. He edited Jane's All the World's Aircraft for three decades during the Cold War. He retired as editor in 1989, just as the Iron Curtain obscuring the Soviet Bloc's technology started to lift.

Taylor, who lived to the age of 77, was a master of a parallel art to Kremlinology, he could deduce the performance of Soviet military equipment from blurred photographs.

"Thus in 1961, when Western intelligence was fascinated by early glimpses of a new Soviet bomber, the Tupolev Tu-22, many analysts estimated it could reach a speed of Mach 2.5 - more than twice the speed of sound. But Taylor, after noting the shape of the aircraft's engine intakes, put the maximum at no more than Mach 1.4, which proved much closer to the truth. In 1983, he analysed the MiG-29 fighter, whose agility was the cause of much anxiety amongst NATO's war-gamers; seven years later, when Jane's was able to check his suggested measurements, they were found to be accurate to within an inch. " The Guardian, Tuesday 25 January 2000.

Taylor was educated at Ely Cathedral Choir School (King's Ely) and Soham Grammar School in Cambridgeshire. He trained as a draughtsman and joined Hawker Aircraft in 1941. There he worked on the development of the Hurricane fighter and its successors. His specialisation was rectifying design defects. He joined Jane's as editorial assistant on Jane's All the World's Aircraft in 1955 and four years later he took over as editor. Until the late 1960s he edited this volume with virtually no editorial support but his love of aviation was such that this was a challenge he enjoyed.
He provided a regular monthly aviation feature in Meccano Magazine throughout the 1940s-1960s.

See also
 Bill Gunston

Works

Books
(partial list)
 Jane's All the World's Aircraft (Editor, 30 years)
 Civil Aircraft of the World,(with Gordon Swanborough) 1972 and 1974, Charles Scribner's Sons, New York
 Combat Aircraft of the World, 1969 Paragon, U.K.; 1979 G.P. Putnam's Sons, New York.
 Helicopters of the World, (with Michael J.H. Taylor) 1978, Charles Scribner's Sons, New York
 Aircraft, Aircraft!

References

External links
 Jane's All the World's Aircraft Editors
 Ely Cathedral Choir School

1922 births
1999 deaths
English editors
Aviation writers
Aviation historians
British aviation historians
British historians
Intelligence analysts
People from Cambridgeshire
Fellows of the Royal Historical Society
Officers of the Order of the British Empire
People educated at King's Ely